Vasilije "Vasa" Pušica (born September 12, 1995) is a Serbian professional basketball player for Śląsk Wrocław of the PLK. He played college basketball for the University of San Diego and the Northeastern University.

Early career 
Pušica started to play basketball in his hometown Belgrade, for the Partizan youth selections.

In 2013, Pušica was recruited to attend a prep school in Kansas, U.S., Sunrise Christian Academy in Bel Aire, a suburb of Wichita. During the 2013–14 season, he averaged 9.3 points and 5.0 rebounds per game.

College career

San Diego Toreros (2014–2016) 
In the Toreros' 2014–15 season, Pušica appeared in 30 games with one start and averaged 4.6 points per game to go along with 2.1 rebounds and a team-leading 74 assists. In the Toreros' 2015–16 season, Pušica appeared in 30 games making 15 starts and averaged 8.3 points per game to go along with 4.0 rebounds and a team-leading 74 assists.

Northeastern Huskies (2016–2019) 
In 2016, was Pušica transferred from San Diego. Under NCAA transfer rules, he had to sit out for the 2016–17 season. Pušica finished his first season with the Huskies as the team's leading scorer with 17.9 points per game, while pulling down 3.6 rebounds per game and dishing out 5.1 assists per game while playing and starting in all 33 games. Also, he added 36 steals while shooting 50.4 percent from the field and 42.7 percent from deep and 80.7 from the free throw line. Pušica appeared in 27 games, including 26 starts in the Huskies' 2018–19 season. He averaged 17.4 points, 3.8 rebounds and 4.1 assists per game.

Professional career

Partizan (2019)
On April 24, 2019, Pušica signed for Partizan NIS of the Basketball League of Serbia.

Italian Serie A (2019–2021)
On August 3, 2019, he has signed with VL Pesaro of the Italian Lega Basket Serie A (LBA).

On June 23, 2020, Pušica signed in the same league, for Dinamo Sassari for the 2019–20 season. He averaged 12.9 points, 3.8 assist and 1.4 steals per game.

2021–22 season
On July 21, 2021, Pušica signed with Baxi Manresa of the Spanish Liga ACB. However, his contract was voided after he failed the physical. On August 18, Pušica signed with BC Labas GAS Prienai of the Lithuanian Basketball League. He averaged 8.2 points and 4.5 assists per game.

On February 25, 2022, Pušica signed with Galatasaray Nef of the Basketbol Süper Ligi and Basketball Champions League.

2022–23 season
On July 9, 2022, he has signed with FMP of the Basketball League of Serbia and the ABA League. However, he parted ways with FMP on August 1.

On November 16, 2022, he signed with Twarde Pierniki Toruń of the Polish Basketball League (PLK).

On February 8, 2023, he signed with Śląsk Wrocław of the PLK.

National team career
Pušica was a member of the Serbian under-16 team that played at the 2011 FIBA Europe Under-16 Championship in the Czech Republic. Over seven tournament games, he averaged 4.0 points, 1.5 rebounds and 1.4 assists per game. Pušica was a member of the Serbian under-18 team that played at the 2013 FIBA Europe Under-18 Championship in Latvia. Over seven tournament games, he averaged 7.9 points, 9.2 rebounds and 2.7 assists per game.

References

External links 
 Statistics at sports-reference.com
 Profile at euroleague.net
 Profile at realgm.com

1995 births
Living people
Basketball League of Serbia players
Basketball players from Belgrade
Galatasaray S.K. (men's basketball) players
KK Partizan players
Lega Basket Serie A players
Northeastern Huskies men's basketball players
Point guards
San Diego Toreros men's basketball players
Shooting guards
Serbian expatriate basketball people in Italy
Serbian expatriate basketball people in Lithuania
Serbian expatriate basketball people in Turkey
Serbian expatriate basketball people in the United States
Serbian men's basketball players
Śląsk Wrocław basketball players
Twarde Pierniki Toruń players
Victoria Libertas Pallacanestro players